The competition had a major setback with the Ukrainian team's visas not being passed in time for them to play a double header in Latvia. The tournament was won by Latvia, with an aggregate score of 110–20.

See also

References

External links

European rugby league competitions
2008 in rugby league